Afareyanaj (also Romanized as Āfareyānaj, Āfarīānaj, and Āfaryānaj; also known as Āfarīānach, Āferyānech, and Ruferīāneh) is a village in Ab Barik Rural District, in the Central District of Sonqor County, Kermanshah Province, Iran. At the 2006 census, its population was 106, in 32 families.

References 

Populated places in Sonqor County